Thyrohyrax was a genus of herbivorous hyrax-grouped mammal.  It may have been semi-aquatic based on isotopic ratios of its tooth enamel.

References

Prehistoric hyraxes
Prehistoric placental genera